The following is a list of awards and nominations received by Tom Cruise throughout his acting career.

Major Awards

Academy Awards

British Academy Film Awards

British Academy Britannia Awards

Cannes Film Festival

Golden Globe Awards
On May 10, 2021, Cruise returned all three of his Golden Globes to the Hollywood Foreign Press Association due to its many controversies, particularly for its lack of diversity, specifically no black members, and ethical questions related to financial benefits to some of its members.

Producers Guild of America Awards

Screen Actors Guild Awards

Industry Awards

American Cinema Awards

Critics' Choice Movie Awards

David di Donatello Awards

Empire Awards

Golden Raspberry Awards

Hasty Pudding Theatricals Awards

MTV Movie Awards

MTV Movie Awards – Mexico

MTV TRL Awards

National Movie Awards

Nickelodeon Kids' Choice Awards

People's Choice Awards

Rembrandt Award

Satellite Awards

Saturn Awards

Scientology

ShoWest Convention

Teen Choice Awards

Walk of Fame

Yoga Awards

See also
 Tom Cruise filmography
 Living Legends of Aviation

Notes

References

Cruise, Tom, list of awards and nominations received by
Awards